The Chicago Central and Pacific Railroad  (Chicago Central & Pacific Railroad) is part of the Illinois Central Railroad (IC), which is owned by the Canadian National Railway (CN) through the Grand Trunk Corporation. Operationally, the Chicago Central & Pacific is designated as the Iowa Zone of CN's Southern Region.

History 
The Iowa Division of the original Illinois Central Railroad began its service to Warren, Illinois in January 1854. By September 1854 the tracks ran to Scales Mound, Illinois and on October 31, 1854, the Illinois Central made it to Galena, Illinois. On June 12, 1855 the tracks were expanded to East Dubuque, Illinois. By December 1868 a draw-bridge was built over the Mississippi River to Dubuque, Iowa. The Dubuque Rail Bridge was rebuilt in the 1890s.

With entrepreneur Jack Haley as president and CEO, the Chicago Central & Pacific Railroad was formed by a spin-off from the by-then-named Illinois Central Gulf. Distinct operations began on December 24, 1985.

The IC repurchased the railroad in 1996 and operated it as a subsidiary until the IC itself was purchased by CN three years later. The operation continues as a subsidiary of the Grand Trunk Corporation.

Structure 
The railroad was organized into eight subdivisions and other spurs. The subdivisions listed from east to west include the following:
 Freeport Subdivision
 Dubuque Subdivision
 Cedar Rapids Subdivision
 Osage Subdivision
 Waterloo Subdivision
 Omaha Subdivision
 Cherokee Subdivision
 Ida Grove Subdivision

References 

Railway companies established in 1985
Illinois railroads
Iowa railroads
Nebraska railroads
Predecessors of the Illinois Central Railroad
Canadian National Railway subsidiaries
Spin-offs of the Illinois Central Gulf Railroad
1985 establishments in Illinois